Divided Heaven may refer to:
 Divided Heaven (novel), translation of Der geteilte Himmel, a 1963 novel by Christa Wolf
 Divided Heaven (film), an East German drama film by Konrad Wolf and based on the novel
 Divided Heaven (band), Los Angeles-based indie-rock band